Crown of Souls is the sixth studio album by death metal band Deeds of Flesh, released on May 17, 2005 (see 2005 in music). It retains a similar style to their previous album Reduced to Ashes. It was generally well received by fans.  The CD was followed up with a music video by critically acclaimed music video director Benjamin Kantor.  The video was released on their Deeds of Flesh: Live In Montreal DVD.

Track listing

Credits 
Jacoby Kingston - Bass, vocals
Erik Lindmark - Guitar, vocals
Mike Hamilton - Drums
Recorded at: Avalon Recording Studio
Produced by: Deeds of Flesh
Engineered by: Kip Stork
All music & lyrics: Deeds of Flesh
Cover art: Raymond Swanland
Viking art: Par Olofsson
Photography: S.E.Miller
Layout: J.K.

2005 albums
Deeds of Flesh albums
Albums with cover art by Pär Olofsson